Snøhvit is the name of a natural gas field in the Norwegian Sea, situated  northwest of Hammerfest, Norway. The northern part of the Norwegian Sea is often described as the Barents Sea by offshore petroleum companies.  Snøhvit is also the name of a development of Snøhvit and the two neighbouring natural gas fields Albatross and Askeladden. Estimated recoverable reserves are 193 billion cubic metres of natural gas,  of condensate (light oil), and 5.1 million tonnes of natural gas liquids (NGL). The development comprises 21 wells. The Snøhvit development is operated by Equinor on behalf of six gas companies owning licenses:
 Petoro 
 TotalEnergies
 GDF Suez 
 Equinor 
 Hess 
 RWE Dea

The fields were discovered in 1984. The development plan was presented by Statoil in 2001. The gas from Snøhvit will be used for liquefied natural gas (LNG) production. The total costs of field development will be around NOK 34.2 billion. The LNG plant will emit 920 thousand tonnes of  each year, an increase of Norway's total  emissions by almost 2%.

The annual export capacity is 5.75 billion cubic metres of LNG, 747 thousand tonnes of condensate and 247 thousand tonnes of liquified petroleum gas. Long-term export contracts have been signed with Iberdrola in Spain and El Paso in the USA.

There are also limited amounts of crude oil in this field. The recent discovery of the nearby Goliat oil field has made the oil reserves at Snøhvit more exploitable.

The development of Snøhvit sparked political controversy in Norway, as it was the first discovery in the Barents Sea to be developed. Environmental groups like Natur og Ungdom and Bellona argued that the Barents Sea is too sensitive for oil and gas production, and that the Melkøya LNG plant would drastically increase Norway's  emissions. In the summer of 2002 protesters from Natur og Ungdom were arrested by the police after blocking the construction of the LNG plant at Melkøya for 10 days.

Geology
The reservoir resides in three fault blocks located in the Hammerfest Basin and consists of Lower to Middle Jurassic sandstones.

See also

 Energy in Norway
 Carbon capture and storage
 Noweco

References

External links
Snøhvit in Aftenbladet Energi Interactive Energy Map
Equinor information page about Snøhvit

Hammerfest
Natural gas fields in Norway
Natural gas fields in the Arctic Ocean
Barents Sea